"This D.J." is the title of a song by American hip hop artist Warren G. It was released in July 1994 as the second single from his debut album, Regulate...G Funk Era. Released as the follow-up to Warren G's smash hit, "Regulate", "This D.J." was another success for Warren, becoming his second consecutive top 10 single in the US, peaking at 9 on the Billboard Hot 100. The single was certified gold by the RIAA and sold 600,000 copies.

Single track listing

A-Side
"This D.J." (LP Version)- 3:23
"This D.J." (Radio Edit)- 3:23

B-Side
"This D.J." (LP Instrumental)- 3:23
"This D.J." (Remix Instrumental)- 3:43
"Regulate" (Remix)- 4:18

Charts

Weekly charts

Year-end charts

Certifications

References

1994 singles
Warren G songs
G-funk songs
Songs written by Warren G
1994 songs